

Temples
The temple of Kalnath Mahadev is located behind the hill fort. It measures thirty-seven feet long by fifteen feet broad by thirty feet high, and includes a partially ruined rest-house built of white sandstone and plastered brick.

Shani Maharaj Mandir and Vadinath Hanumanji established Panchdev Temple with the cooperation of villagers. It is a replica of Shani Singnapur Mandir in Maharashtra. Major performances are staged by the locals as well as shri Shanishwar Group Mulund Mumbai with bapa shri vijay dedhia and Kalpesh shah

Demographics
The population numbers around 3000.

Infrastructure 
It is a small village with 24-hour electricity and broadband. It hosts a milk collection center, a cooperative society, a district cooperative bank, the Gram Panchayat building, a government health center, temples, a playground and a post office.

Geography 
One of the village's landmarks is a beautiful lake called Laleru Talav, which was renovated by Shri. Ambalal Upadhyay.

Education 
Limbhoi has two primary schools, one higher secondary school.

Economy 
The main occupation here is farming and animal husbandry. However, there are also people from many job categories.

References

Notes

Bibliography
 
 This article incorporates text from a publication now in the public domain: 

Villages in Aravalli district